was a Japanese puppet designer and maker, independent film director, screenwriter and animator and   president of the Japan Animation Association from 1989, succeeding founder Osamu Tezuka, until his own death. He is best-remembered in Japan as designer of the puppets for the long-running NHK live action television series of the Romance of the Three Kingdoms in the early 1980s and The Tale of the Heike in the 1990s but better-known internationally for his own animated short films, the majority of which are model animation but which also include the cutout animation Tabi and Shijin no Shōgai and mixed media, French-language Farce anthropo-cynique.

Since beginning his career in his early twenties as a  production design assistant under So Matsuyama in the art department of Toho in 1946, he met Tadasu Iizawa and left the film studio in 1950 to collaborate with him on illustrating children's literature with photographs of dolls in dioramas, many of which have been republished in English editions by such American publishers as Grosset & Dunlap and Western Publishing's Golden Books imprint, and trained in the art of stop motion filmmaking under Tadahito Mochinaga and, later, Jiří Trnka. 

He is also closely associated with Tadanari Okamoto, another independent filmmaker. They collaborated in booking private halls in which to show their films to the public as the "Puppet Animashow" in the 1970s. Okamoto's last film, had been left incomplete following his death during its production. Kawamoto completed the film. The film was based on Kenji Miyazawa's short story The Restaurant of Many Orders.

Biography
Born in 1925, from an early age Kawamoto was captivated by the art of doll and puppet making. After seeing the works of maestro Czech animator Jiří Trnka, he first became interested in stop motion puppet animation and during the 1950s began working alongside Japan's first puppet animator, the legendary Tadahito Mochinaga.

In 1958, he co-founded Shiba Productions to make commercial animation for television, but it was not until 1963, when he traveled to Prague to study puppet animation under Jiří Trnka for a year, that he considered his puppets to have truly began to take on a life of their own. Trnka encouraged Kawamoto to draw on his own country's rich cultural heritage in his work, and so Kawamoto returned from Czechoslovakia to make a series of highly individual, independently produced artistic short works, beginning with Breaking of Branches is Forbidden (Hana-Ori) in 1968.

Heavily influence by the traditional aesthetics of Nō, Bunraku-style puppetry and kabuki, since the '70s his haunting puppet animations such as The Demon (Oni, 1972), Dōjōji Temple (Dōjōji, 1976) and House of Flame (Kataku, 1979) have won numerous prizes internationally. He has also produced cut-out (kirigami) animations such as Travel (Tabi, 1973) and A Poet's Life (Shijin no Shogai, 1974). In 1990 he returned to Trnka's studios in Prague to make Briar Rose, or The Sleeping Beauty.

In Japan, he is best known for designing the puppets used in the long-running TV series based on the Chinese literary classic Romance of the Three Kingdoms (Sangokushi, 1982–84), and later for The Tale of the Heike (Heike Monogatari, 1993–94). In 2003, he was responsible for overseeing the Winter Days (Fuyu no Hi) project, in which 35 of the world's top animators each worked on a two-minute segment inspired by the renka couplets of celebrated poet Matsuo Bashō.

The Book of the Dead (Shisha no Sho) is Kawamoto's only feature length animation, 1981's Rennyo and His Mother (Rennyo to Sono Haha) being a live-action puppet film. It had its world premiere as a part of a Special Retrospective Tribute at the 40th Karlovy Vary International Film Festival (July 1–9, 2005, Karlovy Vary, Czech Republic).

Filmography

Short films
  
 Anthropo-Cynical Farce (Farce anthropo-cynique, January 1, 1970, 8 min., from a story by Riichi Yokomitsu)

Feature films

DVD releases

Short films

Winter Days
See Winter Days.

The Book of the Dead

References

External links
 Interview with Kihachirō Kawamoto at Web site Midnight Eye
 Biography at Nishikata Film Review
 Kawamoto: The Puppet Master, a season centred on Kawamoto's films which toured the United Kingdom in 2008
 Iida City Kawamoto Kihachirō Puppet Museum official Web site 
 Japan Animation Association official Web site 
 
 

1925 births
2010 deaths
Anime directors
Anime screenwriters
Annie Award winners
Japanese animators
Japanese film directors
Puppet designers
Recipients of the Order of the Rising Sun, 4th class
Stop motion animators
People from Tokyo
Japanese Buddhists
Fantasy film directors